At least two ships of the Hellenic Navy have borne the name Aetos ("eagle"):

  an  acquired in 1912 and decommissioned in 1945.
  a  launched in 1944 as USS Slater she was transferred to Greece in 1951 and renamed. She was decommissioned in 1991 and was preserved as a museum ship in the United States.

Hellenic Navy ship names